Olcay Çakır Turgut (born 13 July 1993) is a Turkish basketball player for Fenerbahçe where she played for since 2005 in youth level.

Çakır was selected 27th overall in the 2013 WNBA Draft's Round 3 by the New York Liberty. She is so the first ever woman basketball player from Turkey to be drafted by the WNBA. The only Turkish basketball player who played in the WNBA is Nevriye Yılmaz.

Honors

Individual
2012 FIBA Europe Under-20 Championship for Women – All Tournament Team member

Club
 EuroCup Women champion (2017)
 7x Turkish Women's Basketball League champion (2011, 2012, 2013, 2016, 2017, 2021, 2022)
 5x Turkish Women's Basketball Cup champion (2015, 2016, 2017, 2018, 2020)
 7x Turkish Women's Basketball Presidential Cup champion (2010, 2012, 2013, 2014, 2015, 2017, 2019)

National team
2012 FIBA Europe Under-20 Championship for Women – 
2013 FIBA Europe Under-20 Championship for Women –

See also
Turkish women in sports

References

External links

Player Profile at fenerbahce.org

1993 births
Living people
Basketball players at the 2016 Summer Olympics
Botaş SK players
Fenerbahçe women's basketball players
New York Liberty draft picks
Olympic basketball players of Turkey
Point guards
People from Konak
Sportspeople from İzmir
Turkish women's basketball players